The 49th Daytime Emmy Awards, presented by the National Academy of Television Arts and Sciences (NATAS), honored the best in U.S. daytime television programming in 2021. The award ceremony was held live on June 24, 2022, at the Pasadena Convention Center in Pasadena, California. The ceremony was broadcast in the U.S. on CBS and streamed on Paramount+. Nominations were announced on Thursday, May 5, 2022.

Kevin Frazier and Nischelle Turner, co-anchors of the syndicated entertainment newsmagazine Entertainment Tonight, hosted the ceremony for the first time.

In response to the growth of streaming television, this was the first year under a major realignment of the Daytime and Primetime Emmy Awards, where the two ceremonies' scopes now revolve more around factors such as the themes, format, and style characteristics, instead of strictly dayparts.

Ceremony information

Emmys realignment
In December 2021, the Academy of Television Arts & Sciences (ATAS) and the National Academy of Television Arts and Sciences (NATAS) announced a major realignment of the Emmy Award ceremonies. This was in response to the growth of streaming television, which blurred the lines in determining which shows should fall under the Daytime or Primetime Emmys. The two ceremonies' scopes will now revolve around factors such as the themes and frequency of such programming, rather than strictly dayparts.

Among the major changes that will take effect at the 49th Daytime Emmy Awards in June 2022 and at the 74th Primetime Emmy Awards in September 2022:
 Daytime dramas, as defined as "any multi-camera, weekday daily serial, spin-off or reboot", remain at the Daytime Emmys but most other scripted dramas and comedies will have to enter into the Primetime Emmys. For example, the streaming limited series Days of Our Lives: Beyond Salem may still enter into the Daytime Emmys because it is a spin-off of the daytime soap opera Days of Our Lives, but a previous Daytime Emmy winner like The Bay would have to move to the Primetime Emmys.
 Talk shows will now be divided between the Daytime and Primetime Emmys based on "format and style characteristics reflective of current programming in the daytime or late night space". Such programs may petition to switch ceremonies, such as the previous Daytime Emmy winner The Ellen DeGeneres Show, whose format is more similar to the late night talk shows awarded at the Primetime Emmys.
 All children's programming categories have been moved to the new Children's & Family Emmy Awards.
 Categories for morning shows have been moved from the Daytime Emmys to the News & Documentary Emmy Awards. Such programs may instead enter into the Daytime Emmys' talk show categories depending on their format.

Categories for game shows and instructional programming will remain split this year between the Daytime and Primetime Emmys, with their realignment to be determined in 2023.

Other rule changes
The maximum age limit for those eligible for Outstanding Younger Performer in a Drama Series has been lowered from 25 to 21 (it will be further lowered to 18 in 2023).

Winners and nominees

The nominations for both the 49th Daytime Emmy Awards and the Creative Arts & Lifestyle Daytime Emmy Awards were announced on May 5, 2022. Winners in each category are listed first, in boldface.

Programming

Acting

Hosting

Directing/Writing

Lifetime Achievement Award
 John Aniston, long-running actor on Days of Our Lives who has played Victor Kiriakis since 1985.

Multiple wins

Presenters and performances
The following individuals presented awards or performed musical acts.

Presenters (in order of appearance)

Performers

References

049
2022 in American television
2022 television awards
June 2022 events in the United States